The Swedish School in Moscow (SSIM) is a Swedish international school in Lomonosovsky District, South-Western Administrative Okrug, Moscow, Russia. The language of instruction is Swedish and students are of ages 2 through 16.

Malin Norman, writing for Scan Magazine, described it as "a bit of an oasis for Swedes and other Scandinavians."

History
Circa 1978 there were three students from Norway and eight students from Sweden, and there was a possibility that there would be fewer students from Sweden in later periods.

By 2009 the school also had students from Denmark and Russia.

Campus
The Swedish school is located on the first floor of a campus shared with the Moscow Finnish School, the Moscow Japanese School, and the Scuola Italiana Italo Calvino (Italian school).

See also

 Russia–Sweden relations

References

External links
 Swedish School in Moscow 
 English

International schools in Moscow
Swedish international schools
Russia–Sweden relations